Dean Morrison (born 12 June 1978) is an Australian born cricketer who has represented the Jersey national team since 2008 and was previously selected in the Australian Aboriginal national team in 2004.

References

External links
 

1978 births
Living people
Jersey cricketers
Cricketers from Brisbane